Evghenia Dumic (born 28 January 2003) is a Moldovan footballer who plays as a goalkeeper for Moldovan Women's Football Championship club PGU ȘS4-Legia Tiraspol and the Moldova women's national team.

Club career
Dumic has played for PGU ȘS4-Legia Tiraspol in Moldova.

International career
Dumic capped for Moldova at senior level during the 2023 FIFA Women's World Cup qualification (UEFA).

See also
 List of Moldova women's international footballers

References

External links
 

2003 births
Living people
Moldovan women's footballers
Women's association football goalkeepers
Moldova women's international footballers